Lenin was a mushroom was a highly influential televised hoax by Soviet musician Sergey Kuryokhin and reporter Sergey Sholokhov. It was first broadcast on 17 May 1991 on Leningrad Television.

The hoax took the form of an interview on the television program Pyatoe Koleso (The Fifth Wheel). In the interview, Kuryokhin, impersonating a historian, narrated his findings that Vladimir Lenin consumed large quantities of psychedelic mushrooms and eventually became a mushroom himself. Kuryokhin arrived at his conclusion through a long series of logical fallacies and appeals to the authority of various "sources" (such as Carlos Castaneda, the Massachusetts Institute of Technology, and Konstantin Tsiolkovsky), creating the illusion of a reasoned and plausible logical chain.

The timing of the hoax played a large role in its success, coming as it did during the glasnost period when the ebbing of censorship in the Soviet Union led to many true and untrue revelations about the country's history, often presented in sensational form. Furthermore, Soviet television had, up to that point, been regarded by its audience as conservative in style and content. As a result, a large number of Soviet citizens (one estimate puts the number at 11.3 million audience members) took the deadpan "interview" at face value, in spite of the absurd claims presented.

Sholokhov has said that perhaps the most notable result of the show was an appeal by a group of party members to the Leningrad Regional Committee of the CPSU to clarify the veracity of Kuryokhin's claim. According to Sholokhov, in response to the request one of the top regional functionaries stated that "Lenin could not have been a mushroom" because "a mammal cannot be a plant." Modern taxonomy classifies mushrooms as fungi, a separate kingdom from plants.

See also 

 The Sacred Mushroom and the Cross

References

Further reading

External links 
 Part 1, Part 2 of a subtitled, shortened version of the video
 Partial transcript 
 Full program 

1991 hoaxes
1991 in the Soviet Union
Cultural depictions of Vladimir Lenin
Hoaxes in the Soviet Union
Performance hoaxes
Urban legends